During the 1994–95 Scottish football season, Celtic competed in the Scottish Premier Division. This was also their most recent season in which they did not participate in a European competition.

Competitions

Scottish Premier Division

League table

Matches

Scottish Cup

Scottish League Cup

References

Celtic F.C. seasons
Celtic F.C.